Where the West Begins may refer to:

Out Where the West Begins, a poem by Arthur Chapman published in 1917
"Where the West Begins", the motto for Fort Worth, Texas, the 13th-largest city in the United States of America
Where the West Begins (1919 film), an American film directed by Henry King
Where the West Begins (1928 film), an American film directed by Robert J. Horner
Where the West Begins (1938 film), an American film directed by J.P. McGowan